Polymastia hirsuta is a species of sea sponge belonging to the family Polymastiidae. It is found in various subtidal habitats in the far north of North Island, New Zealand.

This is a usually circular sponge up to 7 cm in diameter. This rather distinctive species is generally brown and silt-covered but with prominent papillae appearing as bright yellow, silt-free lumps over the whole surface.

References

hirsuta
Sponges of New Zealand
Animals described in 1968
Taxa named by Patricia Bergquist